Davie Laird (born 11 February 1936) is a Scottish former footballer, who played for St Mirren and Northampton Town.

External links 

1936 births
Living people
Sportspeople from Rutherglen
Association football inside forwards
Scottish footballers
St Mirren F.C. players
Northampton Town F.C. players
Cambuslang Rangers F.C. players
Folkestone F.C. players
Scottish Football League players
English Football League players
Footballers from South Lanarkshire